Kane Linnett (born 11 January 1989) is a Scotland international rugby league footballer who plays as a  or  forward for Hull Kingston Rovers in the Super League.

He has previously played for the Sydney Roosters and the North Queensland Cowboys in the NRL. Linnett was a member of the Cowboys' 2015 NRL Premiership and 2016 World Club Challenge winning sides.

Background
Linnett was born in Shellharbour, New South Wales, Australia.

He grew up in Barrack Heights, a suburb of Shellharbour.

He attended Warilla High School and played junior football for both the Port Kembla Blacks and Windang Pelicans. While at high school, Linnett was a promising rugby union player, representing New South Wales Country High Schools, but ultimately decided to stick with rugby league.

Playing career

Early career
In 2007, Linnett played for the Illawarra Steelers in the SG Ball Cup, earning a contract with St. George Illawarra.

Linnett played with the St. George Illawarra NYC side between 2008 and 2009, scoring 31 tries in 51 games, before joining the Sydney Roosters.

Sydney Roosters (2010–11)
Linnett made his National Rugby League début in round 14 of the 2010 NRL season. He ran for over 200m and scored a try in the Sydney Roosters' 38–6 win over Melbourne.

He finished the season as a member of the Sydney Roosters 2010 NRL Grand Final team that lost to his former club, St. George Illawarra, by a score of 32–8.

In 2011, Linnett was limited to just 10 NRL games. In round 23, he played on through a season-ending knee injury, scoring a try in the Sydney Roosters' 20–12 victory over the St. George Illawarra.

On 3 August 2011, he signed a two-year contract with North Queensland.

North Queensland Cowboys (2012–18)
Linnett scored his first try for the North Queensland in the side's round 3 match against Parramatta.

Two weeks later, in the North Queensland Cowboys round 5 win against the Canberra Raiders, Linnett set a club record for most metres by a North Queensland Cowboys , with 234.

He was named the North Queensland Cowboys' 'Most Improved' for 2012, at the club's annual presentation ball.

In 2013, Linnett played in every single game for the North Queensland club scoring 9 tries.

At the end of the 2013 season, Linnett represented Scotland at the 2013 Rugby League World Cup, qualifying to play for them through his mother.

On 11 February 2014, Linnett re-signed with the North Queensland Cowboys for a further two seasons.

Later that month, Linnett was a part of the North Queensland club's victorious Auckland Nines team and was subsequently named in the 'Team of the Tournament.

In round 3 of the 2015 NRL season, Linnett played his 100th NRL game.

In May 2016, Linnett represented his Country Origin for the first time.

In October 2016, Linnett was named in Scotland's 2016 Four Nations squad.

In round 3 of the 2017 NRL season, Linnett played his 150th NRL game in North Queensland club's 30–8 loss to the Manly-Warringah Sea Eagles.

In North Queensland's semi-final win over Parramatta, Linnett played his 150th game for the club.

Linnett played in all 28 games for the club in 2017, scoring five tries.

Linnett made 12 appearances for the North Queensland Cowboys in 2018, as the club struggled towards the bottom of the ladder for the entire season but won their final two games to avoid the wooden spoon.

In September 2018, it was revealed that Linnett was one of several North Queensland Cowboys' players told that they would not be offered a contract for the 2019 season.

On 13 September 2018, it was announced by North Queensland that Linnett was one of nine players leaving the club at the end of the 2018 season.

Hull Kingston Rovers (2019 – present)
On 14 November 2018, Linnett signed a three-year deal with Super League club, Hull Kingston Rovers.

On 9 January 2019, Linnett received the number 23 jersey ahead of the start of the Super League season.

On 13 January 2019, Linnett made his non-competitive Hull Kingston Rovers' début in a try scoring pre-season friendly against the Widnes Vikings, Linnett claimed a 30–16 victory with his new club.

Linnett made his first competitive appearance for Hull Kingston Rovers in round 1 of the 2019 Super League season, Linnett who started the game in the  recorded a thrilling 18-16 victory over cross-city rivals Hull F.C. at Craven Park.

On 17 February 2019, in round 3 in a game against the London Broncos, Linnett scored his first try in the Super League.

In round 4 of the 2021 Super League season, he scored a hat-trick in Hull KR's 26-6 victory over Leeds.

In round 8 of the 2021 Super League season, Linnett scores two tries for Hull KR in a 40-16 victory over Leigh.
Linnett made a total of 20 appearances for Hull KR in the 2021 Super League season including the club's 28-10 semi-final loss against the Catalans Dragons.

Honours

Career awards and accolades

Individual

Club (North Queensland Cowboys 2012–18)
North Queensland Cowboys Most Improved: 2012
2014 NRL Auckland Nines: 2014 'Team of the Tournament'

Team

Club (North Queensland Cowboys 2012–18)
2014 NRL Auckland Nines: North Queensland Cowboys – Winner
2015 NRL Grand Final: North Queensland Cowboys – Winners
2016 World Club Challenge: North Queensland Cowboys – Winners

Statistics

National Rugby League (2010–18)
 Statistics are correct to the end of the 2018 season.

International (2013–16)

Super League (2019 – present)

References

External links
Hull KR profile
North Queensland Cowboys profile
Cowboys profile 
SL profile
Scotland profile
Scotland RL profile

1989 births
Living people
Australian rugby league players
Australian people of Scottish descent
Country New South Wales Origin rugby league team players
Hull Kingston Rovers players
Mackay Cutters players
Newtown Jets NSW Cup players
North Queensland Cowboys players
Rugby league centres
Rugby league players from New South Wales
Rugby league wingers
Scotland national rugby league team players
Sydney Roosters players